The 1929 World Chess Championship was played between challenger Efim Bogoljubov and titleholder Alexander Alekhine. The match was held in Wiesbaden, Heidelberg and Berlin in Germany, and the Hague, Rotterdam and Amsterdam in the Netherlands, from September 6 to November 12. Alekhine retained his title.

Background
Alekhine had been world champion since his 1927 victory over José Raúl Capablanca.

In 1928, Bogoljubov won a major tournament at Bad Kissingen, ahead of Capablanca and most other leading players of the day except for Alekhine. Following this win, he challenged Alekhine for the world title. There was also an alternative offer of a return match against Capablanca in Bradley Beach, New Jersey, USA.

Under the rules at the time, the champion chose the challenger, and Alekhine chose to play a match against Bogoljubov.

Results

The first player to win six games and score more than 15 points would be champion.

Notes

References

External links
1929 World Chess Championship at the Internet Archive record of Graeme Cree's Chess Pages

1929
1929 in chess
1929 in German sport